Gates Airport  is a public use airport in Geauga County, Ohio, United States. It is located four nautical miles (5 mi, 7 km) north of the central business district of Garrettsville, a village in Portage County, Ohio. The airport is privately owned by the Cleveland Parachute Center and managed by Robert Gates.

Facilities and aircraft 
Gates Airport covers an area of 146 acres (59 ha) at an elevation of 1,110 feet (338 m) above mean sea level. It has one runway designated 8/26 with a turf and gravel surface measuring 2,800 by 100 feet (853 x 30 m).

For the 12-month period ending September 9, 2010, the airport had 4,200 general aviation aircraft operations, an average of 11 per day.

References

External links 
 Cleveland Parachute Center
 Aerial image as of April 1994 from USGS The National Map

Airports in Ohio
Buildings and structures in Geauga County, Ohio
Transportation in Geauga County, Ohio